Ernesto Andrés Zamora Sugo (born 13 April 1983) is a Uruguayan long distance runner who specialises in the marathon. He competed in the men's marathon event at the 2016 Summer Olympics held in Rio de Janeiro, Brazil. In 2017, he competed in the men's marathon event at the 2017 World Championships in Athletics held in London, England.

References

External links
 

1983 births
Living people
Uruguayan male long-distance runners
Uruguayan male marathon runners
Athletes (track and field) at the 2016 Summer Olympics
Olympic athletes of Uruguay
World Athletics Championships athletes for Uruguay
Sportspeople from Montevideo